Cadalso de los Vidrios is a municipality the Community of Madrid, Spain. Located in the southwest of the region, it lies on the spurs of the Sistema Central. It is noted by its granite quarries. The municipality covers an area of 47.64  km2. , it has a population of 3,049.

References 

Municipalities in the Community of Madrid